Faye Tso (1933–2004) was a Navajo potter and herbal medicine healer. Her pieces are known for their nontraditional imagery of corn maidens, warriors, and dancers, whereas Navajo pottery typically has little decoration. Born in Coal Mine Mesa, Arizona, Tso was relocated with other Navajos to Tuba City, Arizona in 1974 because of a land dispute between the Navajo and Hopi tribes. She returned to dig her clay at Coal Mine Mesa, where she also gathered pinon from which she extracted the pitch resin used to coat and seal her Dineh pottery. In 1990, the Arizona Indian Living Treasures Association designated Tso as a living treasure. Her husband and son are medicine men and use Tso's pots in their ceremonies.

Noted works
Tso's works have sold for over $1,000, and several of her pieces are held in the  Smithsonian American Art Museum:
 Head of Emmett, c. 1985, fired clay with piñon pitch, Smithsonian American Art Museum, 1997.124.175 
 Bean Pot with Incised Corn Maiden Figures, 1987, fired clay with piñon pitch, Smithsonian American Art Museum, 1997.124.176 
 Pot with Dancers with Headdresses and Rattles, c. 1985, fired clay with piñon pitch, Smithsonian American Art Museum, 1997.124.177 
 Pot with Figurative Decoration, c. 1992, fired clay with piñon pitch, Smithsonian American Art Museum, 1997.124.178

References

1933 births
2004 deaths
Native American potters
Artists from Arizona
Native American women artists
Navajo artists
People from Coconino County, Arizona
20th-century ceramists
20th-century American women
20th-century American people
20th-century Native Americans
21st-century Native Americans
20th-century Native American women
21st-century Native American women